Vahid-Dastjerdi is a surname. Notable people with the surname include:

Hamid Vahid-Dastjerdi (born 1959), Iranian philosopher
Marzieh Vahid-Dastjerdi (born 1959), Iranian academic and politician, daughter of Seifollah
Seifollah Vahid Dastjerdi (1926–1999), Iranian physician

Compound surnames